Sian Rainsley (born 19 April 1997) is a British triathlete.

She competed at the 2014 Youth Olympic Games winning a silver medal, 2021 European Triathlon Championships winning a bronze medal, 2022 World Triathlon Championship Series Leeds finishing 15th, and 2022 World Triathlon Championship Series Hamburg, finishing first.

She was named to the 2022 Commonwealth Games, team England. She came 12th in the women's event.

She was diagnosed with Crohn’s Disease.

References 

1997 births
British female triathletes
Living people
People with Crohn's disease
Triathletes at the 2014 Summer Youth Olympics
Triathletes at the 2022 Commonwealth Games
Commonwealth Games competitors for England
20th-century British women
21st-century British women